Debbie Barker is a former American television actress. She was active between 1986 and 1994. Her best-known roles include two appearances on the sitcom Mr. Belvedere and a supporting part in the television film The Stepford Children.

She has also appeared in a variety of American television shows including Matlock (Season 4, Episode 84: The student), Alien Nation, They Came from Outer Space, Rags to Riches, Down and Out in Beverly Hills and Night Court. Debbie Barker also appeared in the 1988 direct to video movie Wolfpack and had a small role portraying Jill St. John in the television film Poor Little Rich Girl: The Barbara Hutton Story.

References

External links
 

American television actresses
Living people
Year of birth missing (living people)
21st-century American women